Dmytro Markovych Dobkin (Ukrainian: Дмитро Маркович Добкін; born on 8 January 1974), is a Ukrainian politician who had served as a member of parliament, a people's deputy of Ukraine of the Verkhovna Rada, as a member of the Party of Regions and the Opposition Bloc from 2012 to 2019. He is a younger brother of politician Mykhailo Dobkin.

Biography
In 2005, Dobkin was elected a member of the Kharkiv Regional Council of the 5th convocation. On 1 November 2010 was elected to the Kharkiv Oblast Council of the VI convocation. In the 2012 parliamentary elections, Dobkin was elected a People's Deputy of Ukraine from the Party of Regions in the single-mandate majoritarian constituency No. 178. According to the voting results, he won with 65.59% of the votes.

References

1975 births
Living people
Politicians from Kharkiv
Party of Regions politicians